Józef Szmidt (born 28 March 1935 as Josef Schmidt) is a former Polish athlete.

He was born in Miechowitz, Beuthen, Province of Upper Silesia, Germany. With a jump of 17.03m in 1960, Szmidt was the first triple jumper to reach 17 metres.

Biography
Szmidt, a mechanic by profession, was the world's leading triple jumper in the early 1960s, becoming European champion in 1958 and 1962, and Olympic champion in 1960 and 1964. The two latter years he was awarded the Sportsman of the Year prize in Poland. In 1975 Szmidt settled in West Germany, but returned to Poland in 1992. He is the brother of track and field athlete Edward Szmidt, who competed at the 1956 Summer Olympics.

See also
 Triple jump world record progression

References

External links
 
 
 
 

1935 births
Living people
Polish male triple jumpers
People from the Province of Upper Silesia
Sportspeople from Bytom
Olympic athletes of Poland
Olympic gold medalists for Poland
Athletes (track and field) at the 1960 Summer Olympics
Athletes (track and field) at the 1964 Summer Olympics
Athletes (track and field) at the 1968 Summer Olympics
World record setters in athletics (track and field)
European Athletics Championships medalists
Polish people of German descent
Medalists at the 1964 Summer Olympics
Medalists at the 1960 Summer Olympics
Olympic gold medalists in athletics (track and field)
Śląsk Wrocław athletes